Diane Joy Brand is a New Zealand architecture academic. She is currently a full professor at the University of Auckland.

Academic career
After a BArch at Auckland in 1979 and practising professionally, Brand did a post-professional Masters of architecture in urban design at Harvard Returning Auckland for a PhD, her 2001 doctoral thesis was titled Southern crossings : colonial urban design in Australia and New Zealand. She subsequently entered academia, working at both Victoria University of Wellington (rising to full professor in 2011) and then back to the  University of Auckland.

Much of Brand's work concerns 'bluespace'—coastly urban design.

Brand is a member of both the New Zealand Institute of Architects and the Royal Australian Institute of Architects and has been involved with CERA, rebuilding Christchurch after the earthquakes. She is also on the New Zealand Registered Architects Board.

Selected works
 Brand, Diane. "Bluespace: a typological matrix for port cities." Urban Design International 12, no. 2-3 (2007): 69–85.
 Brand, Diane. "Surveys and sketches: 19th‐century approaches to colonial urban design." Journal of Urban Design 9, no. 2 (2004): 153–175.

References

External links
 
 
 Institutional homepage

Living people
New Zealand women academics
New Zealand architects
University of Auckland alumni
Academic staff of the University of Auckland
Harvard Graduate School of Design alumni
Year of birth missing (living people)
New Zealand women writers